The Husband is a 2013 Canadian comedy film directed by Bruce McDonald. It was screened in the Special Presentation section at the 2013 Toronto International Film Festival.

Cast
 Maxwell McCabe-Lokos as Henry Andreas
 Sarah Allen as Alyssa Andreas
 Dylan Authors as Colin Nesmith
 August Diehl as Rusty
 Joey Klein as Les
 Jodi Balfour as Claire
 Stephen McHattie as Armand
 Tony Nappo as Colin's Dad

References

External links
 
 The Husband at Library and Archives Canada

2013 films
2013 comedy films
Canadian comedy films
English-language Canadian films
Films directed by Bruce McDonald
2010s English-language films
2010s Canadian films